tRNA-nucleotidyltransferase 1, is an enzyme that in humans is encoded by the TRNT1 gene.
This enzyme adds the nucleotide sequence CCA to the 3' end of tRNA, using ATP and CTP as substrates. The sequence creates the binding site for an amino acid.

References

Further reading